Sekai Project is an American video game publisher. They are best known for licensing and translating Japanese visual novels into English, but they have also published manga and other non-visual novel video games.

History
Sekai Project originated in 2007 as a fan translation group translating the visual novel School Days.  They later partnered with publisher JAST USA, turning their fan translation into the official English version of the game.  Sekai Project began publishing games on Steam in 2014; their first title was World End Economica episode.01, released in June.  Sekai Project has used the crowdfunding platform Kickstarter to fund many of their projects.  In November 2014, they launched a Kickstarter campaign to fund an English release of the visual novel Clannad. The campaign exceeded its goal of US$140,000 and ended up raising over US$500,000. In July 2015, Sekai Project announced that they would be localizing manga in addition to video games, starting with Gate.

Since Steam does not typically allow adult games to be sold on their platform, Sekai Project releases their adult titles through their partner company Denpasoft.  For titles like The Fruit of Grisaia, an all ages version is available on Steam, while the adult version is sold directly through the Denpasoft website.

In 2017, the company partnered with Humble Bundle, an online marketplace where games are sold based on what other users paid for them. As is usual for the Humble Bundle site, users were also able to donate a portion of their payment to the charity of their choice.

In June 2018, Sekai Project provided a censored version of the adult game Maitetsu to Fakku to distribute, contrary to what Sekai Project had promised them and their customers.

In August 2018, Sekai Project laid off some or all of their permanent staff in their Los Angeles office. In a statement to the press, they said most of the staff let go were marketing, but one of their employees posted to Twitter claiming that every employee in the LA office was laid off. Most of the translation and programming work for the company is freelance work that is done remotely. This has continued since the layoffs.

Sekai Games
In 2018, Sekai Project opened Sekai Games, a console focused division within the company structure. Since then, Sekai Games has handled all publishing and marketing for their console releases. On April 14, 2020, Sekai Games and Limited Run Games released a physical edition of Clannad for Nintendo Switch. In 2021, Sekai Games announced they were going to begin publishing games on Xbox Series X and S, having previously only published games on Nintendo and Sony consoles.

Works

Published games

Upcoming games

Other releases

See also

Notes

References

External links
 
 Sekai Games website
 

Companies based in Los Angeles
Video game companies of the United States
Video game publishers
Video game companies established in 2007